Nikolay Makarevich (born 22 May 2002) is a Belarusian professional footballer who plays for Zhodino-Yuzhnoye on loan from Torpedo-BelAZ Zhodino.

References

External links 
 
 

2002 births
Living people
People from Barysaw
Sportspeople from Minsk Region
Belarusian footballers
Association football midfielders
FC Torpedo-BelAZ Zhodino players